Virtue Runs Wild is a Danish 1966 erotic comedy film. The film was shot in 1965 in the North Jutland town of Stenbjerg; it is called "Hu" in the film.

Cast 
 John Hahn-Petersen – Edward
 Birgitte Federspiel – Ina (Edward's wife)
 Axel Strøbye – N.O.
 Louis Miehe-Renard – Joachim
 Bodil Steen – Andrea (Joachim's wife)
  – Anna (waitress)
 Morten Grunwald – Niels (fisherman)
 Birgit Sadolin – Bertha (Niels' wife)
 Carl Ottosen – Monni (fisherman)
 Lise Thomsen – Elly (Monni's wife)
 Arthur Jensen – Ivar (fisherman)
 Lily Broberg – Mille (Ivar's wife)
  – Marinus (fisherman)
 Gunnar Lemvigh – Police Constable Dørup
 Gabriel Axel – Minister Deje
 Ole Monty – Train Station Headmaster
 
 Bjørn Puggaard-Müller – School Headmaster

References

External links 
 
 

1966 films
Danish comedy films
1960s Danish-language films
Films directed by Sven Methling
Films scored by Sven Gyldmark
Films shot in Denmark